Vinyl # 1 is the first studio album by Russian singer Zivert, released on 27 September 2019 by Pervoe Muzykal 'noe Izdatel'stvo.

Promotion 
The project was anticipated by the release of three individual extracts. The first, "Life", released on November 30, 2018, and accompanied by a music video shot in Hong Kong, entered the rankings of four markets the following year, including Bulgaria and Latvia, resulting one of the most successful songs throughout 2019 on the main Russian streaming platforms, i.e.  Yandex Music and VK Music.

On April 26, 2019 "Šarik" was presented, the second extract from the album. "Beverly Hills", which achieved a fair amount of popularity in the Bulgarian and Russian radio charts, was released through a remix EP on 25 September 2019, while the related music video was released on 21 November 2019.

Although it was not extracted as a single, the track "Credo" managed to place itself at the top of the Russian radio charts of Tophit, becoming the first number one in the canta.

References

2019 albums
Albums by Russian artists